Tommi "Auge" Kautonen (born 24 December 1971 in Lahti, Finland) is a Finnish football manager and former player who is the head coach of Finland national under-21 football team.

As a player Kautonen played as a midfielder for Reipas Lahti, FC Haka, MyPa, Vaasan Palloseura (known then as VPS Vaasa) and FC Lahti. He is the only player who played in every Veikkausliiga season since its beginning to the season 2006. Kautonen made his debut in highest tier on 1 October 1989 in a match between Reipas and Kemin Palloseura. He ended his career in match between FC Lahti and KooTeePee on 29 October 2006. Kautonen played total of 377 league matches and scored 21 goals. In 1999, he won the Finnish League Cup with Vaasan Palloseura. In 2004, he was chosen the best midfielder in Veikkausliiga. Kautonen has nine caps in Finnish national football team. He has also played 27 youth internationals.

Kautonen's brothers Turo, Mikko and Olli are also former league football players, as well as his father Timo. Kautonen is a childhood friend of national team captain Jari Litmanen. His nickname "Auge" refers to Klaus Augenthaler while his former playmate Litmanen is known in similar fashion as "Litti" after Pierre Littbarski.

References

External links

Living people
1971 births
Finnish footballers
Association football midfielders
Finland international footballers
Veikkausliiga players
FC Lahti players
Sportspeople from Lahti